Arthur Harley may refer to:

 Arthur Harley (gymnast), British gymnast
 Arthur Harley (politician), New Zealand political candidate